This is a chronological list of Nissan vehicles assembled and built by Yue Loong (later Yulon). Dates given are of introduction to the market.

1960s
 Bluebird 210 – YLN 701, 1960.3–?.
 Bluebird 310 – YLN 704, 1963–1964.
 Bluebird 510 – YLN 706, ?–1972.
 Cedric 30 – YLN 801, 1960–1965.
 Cedric 130 – YLN 801A, 1965–1971.
 Bluebird 410 – YLN 705B, 1964–1965.
 582 – YLN 101
 681 – YLN 401A,?–1968.
 690 – YLN 512
 C40 Caball - YLN 851
 C240 Caball - YLN 851B
 VC142 Caball- YLN 851-2

1970s
 Datsun 320 (Nissan E engine) – YLN 751.
 Datsun 520 (Nissan J engine) – YLN 751C.
 Datsun 620 (Nissan J engine) – YLN 752/753, 1973–1979.
 Cedric 230 – YLN 802 (H20 engine)
 Cedric 330 – YLN 803/805 (L24 engine), also available with SD22 diesel engine)
 Homer T20 – YLN 251(light truck with J16 engine)
 Homer F20 – YLN 253
 Laurel C230 – YLN 902 (L20 engine)
 Sunny B210 – YLN 301 (A12 engine)
 Sunny B310 (A12 engine) – YLN 302 (early version), 1979–1980.
 Violet 710 – YLN 707 (J16 engine), 1977–1979.
 Violet A10 – YLN 709/711/712 (4/5-door), 1979–?.

1980s

 Datsun 720 – YLN 755
 Bluebird 910 – YLN 911/912
 Bluebird U11 – YLN 921 (2.0)/923 (1.8)/923 W (1.8 wagon)
 Caravan E23 – YLN 747
 Cedric 430 – YLN 806/807
 Cedric Y30 – YLN 811/830 (CA20S/VG30E), 1984–1991.
 Homer F22 – YLN 255/256/261
 Stanza T11 – YLN 721 (4/5d)
 Sunny B310 (A12 engine) – YLN 303, 1981–1992.
 Sunny Truck – YLN 303T, 1983–1992.
 Sunny B11 – YLN 311 (4d/Wagon)
 Sunny B12 – YLN 321
 Vanette C120 – YLN 352/353

1990s
 AD Resort Y10 – YLN Y10
 Cabstar F23
 Cefiro A32 – YLN A32
 March K11 – YLN K11, 1993–2007.
 Primera P10 – YLN 931
 Sentra B13 – YLN 331
 Sentra B14 – YLN 341
 Vanette C22 – YLN 361
 Verita A retro styled car, bases on the March K11, 1997–2007.

2000s
 Nissan Cabstar F24
 Cefiro A33
 Livina / Grand Livina L10
 Sentra 180/200/M1 based on the Bluebird Sylphy N16 – Yulon claimed that it designed this modification of the Almera/Pulsar, and that Nissan in Japan decided to take it up.
 Serena Q-RV longer wheelbase and body updated by Yulon
 Teana J31
 Tiida C11
 X-Trail T30
 Cabstar F24
 Livina L11
 Teana J32
 Tiida C11
 March K13
 Sentra B17

Now assembled in Taiwan
 Tiida C12
 Sentra B18
 Kicks P15
 X-Trail T32

References

Nissan vehicles Yulon Motors has built under license
Taiwan transport-related lists
Lists of vehicles
Yulon Motors